was a village located in Kunohe District, Iwate Prefecture, Japan.

The village of Yamagata was created on April 1, 1889 within Kita-Kunohe District with the establishment of the municipality system. Kita-Kunohe District and Minami-Kunohe Districts merged to form Kunohe District on April 1, 1897. The mountainous area was formerly known for a number of mines, especially ironsand. On March 6, 2006, Yamagata was merged into the expanded city of Kuji.

As of March 1, 2006, the village had an estimated population of 3,121 and a population density of 7.89 persons per km². The total area was 295.49 km².

Climate

References

External links
 Kuji official website 

Dissolved municipalities of Iwate Prefecture
Kuji, Iwate